Rick Lober (born 1941) is an American musician who was the original keyboardist for the psychedelic rock band The Amboy Dukes in the 1960s. The group is known for its only hit "Journey to the Center of the Mind". His bandmates were Ted Nugent, Steve Farmer, John Drake, Dave Palmer and Bill White.

Career

The Amboy Dukes 
The Amboy Dukes were local favorites in the metro Detroit area long before Nugent established himself as the 'Motor City Madman'.
Their first single that achieved national success outside of the Detroit area was "Baby, Please Don't Go" a cover of a Big Joe Williams song. It was often played live and on the local Detroit television show "Robin Seymour's Swingin Time". The song highlighted the early style of Nugent's guitar virtuosity and was also known for the wild and exciting keyboard antics of Lober. It featured one of the most stellar keyboard solos of the psychedelic rock era. Lober helped to create the group's first album The Amboy Dukes which charted.

Post-Dukes 
Since his time with The Amboy Dukes, Lober has performed continuously throughout the Detroit area with local favorites such as 'Benny and the Jets'.
His songwriting and studio work resurfaced in 2000 on Farmer's Journey to the Darkside of the Mind an album on Saint Thomas Records. Four of the album tracks are credited to Lober on this release. It was recorded at Victor Peraino's studio of Arthur Brown fame.

Lober remains an iconic staple of the Detroit music scene, still dazzling crowds with his unique keyboard stylizations. He has been performing with legendary Detroit guitarist Jeffrey Faust, "The Woodsman", in and around the Michigan area. Both Faust and Lober are currently signed to Saint Thomas Records and have been working with Farmer to create new recordings.

At the 18th annual Detroit Music Awards on April 17, 2009, the original lineup of The Amboy Dukes performed on stage for the first time in thirty years. On stage at The Fillmore Detroit were Nugent on lead guitar, Farmer on guitar, Drake on vocals, Lober on keyboards, Andy Solomon on keyboards and White on bass. In recognition of the band's contribution to rock music history, they received a Distinguished Achievement award.

References

External links 
 The Woodsman on MySpace Music
 The Director of Saint Thomas Records on MySpace

American rock keyboardists
Living people
The Amboy Dukes members
21st-century American keyboardists
Place of birth missing (living people)
1941 births